The 2001 World Orienteering Championships, the 19th World Orienteering Championships, were held in Tampere, Finland, 26 July – 4 August 2001.

The championships had eight events; sprint (new) for men and women, the classic distance (formerly called individual) for men and women, the short distance for men and women, and relays for men and women.

Medalists

References 

World Orienteering Championships
2001 in Finnish sport
International sports competitions hosted by Finland
August 2001 sports events in Europe
Orienteering in Finland
Sports competitions in Tampere